Puthenchira  is a village in Thrissur district in the state of Kerala, India.

Demographics
 India census, Puthenchira had a population of 21416 with 9815 males and 11601 females.

History

Puthenchira and the surrounding areas were earlier known as Mahadevar Pattanam.
In the second or the third century the Perumanadikals created a ‘Chira’ (causeway/bund) for the purpose of agriculture. The Cheraman Perumal designated  the place for building the ‘Chira’  by throwing Puthen( the coin prevailing then). Since then it is believed that this place is called Puthenchira.  
                                         
Various muris(parts) of Puthenchira were ruled by the Kodungallur Thampuran and Mukundapuram (Muriyanatt-Nadavarambu) Nambiar after the Chera dynasty fell in the 12th Century. Later when Samudiri extended his territory, both Puthenchira and Kodungallur became part of his empire. Later in 1761, the Cochin king sought help from Travancore. Travancore obliged and defeated Samudiri in the battle, delighted by this, the Cochin king gave Puthenchira to Divan Ayyappan Marthandapillai  who was the commander of the  Travancore army. The Divan dedicated Puthenchira to the Travancore king. So until the  Travancore Cochin merger  in 1949 Puthenchira was a Travancore village in the Cochin kingdom.

Puthenchira is the birthplace of Villwamangalam Swamiyar.It is believed that Paramel Thrikkov temple was built by Swamiyar.Puthenchira is also the birthplace of St. Mariam Thresia Chiramel and Joseph Vithayathil, who is the founder of St. Mary's GHSSK school. Neighboring places are Kuthirathadam, Mala, Kuzhikattusery, and Konathukunnu.

Books about Puthenchira

 Sunil Villwamangalath: സ്വന്തം പുത്തന്‍ചിറ ചരിത്രവഴികളിലൂടെ, Dec. 2014.

References

Villages in Mukundapuram Taluk